César Iván Benítez (born 22 May 1990 in Asunción) is a Paraguayan football defender who currently plays for 12 de Octubre.

Benitez played for the Paraguay national football team at the 2009 FIFA U-20 World Cup in Egypt. He made his debut with the senior side in a friendly against Chile on 4 November 2009.

References

External links

1990 births
Living people
Paraguayan footballers
Paraguayan expatriate footballers
Paraguay under-20 international footballers
Paraguay international footballers
Association football defenders
Sportspeople from Asunción
Campeonato Brasileiro Série A players
Campeonato Brasileiro Série B players
Paraguayan Primera División players
Cerro Porteño players
Coritiba Foot Ball Club players
Club Olimpia footballers
Sportivo Luqueño players
12 de Octubre Football Club players
Expatriate footballers in Brazil
Paraguayan expatriate sportspeople in Brazil